Hrag is an Armenian given name. Notable people with the name include:

 Hrag Vartanian (born 1973/1974), American arts writer, art critic, and art curator
 Hrag Yedalian (born 1981), Armenian-American documentary film director and producer

Armenian given names